Bradley Battersby is an American film director and screenwriter. He is the chair of the Film Department at the Ringling College of Art and Design in Sarasota, Florida.

He was named "Mentor of the Year" by Variety magazine in 2017.

Filmography

Writer & director
 Jesus the Driver (2004)
 Red Letters (2000)
 The Joyriders (1999)
 Blue Desert (1991)

External links

American film directors
American male screenwriters
1953 births
Living people